Mansur Mustafaevich Isaev (born 23 September 1986 in Kizilyurt, Dagestan) is a Russian judoka. In 2012, he won the gold medal at the 2012 Summer Olympics in the -73 kg class against the Japanese judoka Riki Nakaya. This was Russia's second gold medal at the Games, after judoka Arsen Galstyan's victory two days earlier in Men's 60 kg.

References

External links
 
 
 
 
 

Living people
1986 births
Avar people
People from Kizilyurt
Russian male judoka
Judoka at the 2012 Summer Olympics
Olympic medalists in judo
Olympic gold medalists for Russia
Olympic judoka of Russia
Medalists at the 2012 Summer Olympics
Sportspeople from Dagestan